Bagaeus (Old Iranian: Bagaya) (fl. circa 520-517 BCE), son of Artontes, was an Achaemenid nobleman, who was ordered by Darius I to kill the rebellious satrap of Lydia, Oroetes. Oroetes was accused of having killed Mitrobates, the satrap of Daskyleion (Hellespontine Phrygia) and his son, but is best known as the murderer of Polycrates of Samos. Herodotus recounts how Bagaeus used written orders from Darius in order to assure himself of the obedience of the bodyguards of Oroetes to the orders of Darius, and when assured, produced a final order to kill Oroetes:

Bagaeus then went to the court of Oroetes in Sardis, Lydia, and produced the letters one by one:

It is thought that Bagaeus may have become the new satrap for a short time after this assassination.

References

6th-century BC Iranian people
Achaemenid satraps of Lydia
Officials of Darius the Great